Sung Han-kook (born November 19, 1963) is a former badminton player and coach from South Korea.

Career
Sung won the men's singles title at the 1986 U.S. Open and earlier that year, he won bronze at the 1986 Asian Games as well as men's team gold.  He was also a part of the team that finished as runner-up at the inaugural Sudirman Cup in 1989.

In 1989, Sung married two-time All England winner Kim Yun-ja. Sung and Kim's daughter Sung Ji-hyun is also a badminton player.

After retiring, Sung had a long career as a coach, both for Korean professional teams and for the national team. He became the head coach of the national team in December 2010 and held the post until he was dismissed in August 2012 following a match-throwing scandal at the London Olympics.

Achievements

Asian Games 
Men's singles

IBF World Grand Prix 
The World Badminton Grand Prix sanctioned by International Badminton Federation (IBF) from 1983 to 2006.

Men's doubles

Men's singles

References 

South Korean male badminton players
Asian Games medalists in badminton
1963 births
Living people
Badminton players at the 1982 Asian Games
Badminton players at the 1986 Asian Games
Badminton players at the 1990 Asian Games
Asian Games gold medalists for South Korea
Asian Games bronze medalists for South Korea
Badminton coaches
Medalists at the 1982 Asian Games
Medalists at the 1986 Asian Games
Medalists at the 1990 Asian Games